is a passenger railway station located in the town of Higashimiyoshi, Miyoshi District, Tokushima Prefecture, Japan. It is operated by JR Shikoku and has the station number "B21".

Lines
Only local trains stop at the station.

Layout
The station consists of a side platform serving a single track on a sidehill cutting. There is no station building, only a shelter on the platform for waiting passengers. A ramp, with two steps, leads up to the platform from the access road. A bike shed is located at the base of the ramp.

Adjacent stations

History
Japanese National Railways (JNR) opened Mikamo on 15 December 1961, as an added station on the existing Tokushima Main Line. With the privatization of JNR on 1 April 1987, the station came under the control of JR Shikoku. On 1 June 1988, the line was renamed the Tokushima Line.

Surrounding area
Higashimiyoshi Municipal Misho Elementary School
 Japan National Route 192
 Kanemaru Hachiman Shrine

See also
 List of Railway Stations in Japan

References

External links

 JR Shikoku timetable

Railway stations in Tokushima Prefecture
Railway stations in Japan opened in 1961
Higashimiyoshi, Tokushima